Mulwala (locally  , elsewhere also  ) is a town in the Federation Council local government area in the Riverina district of New South Wales, Australia.  The town is situated on Lake Mulwala, an artificial lake formed by the damming of the Murray River. At the 2021 census, Mulwala had a population of 2,557 people. The town's name is derived from an aboriginal word for 'rain'.

Overview 
Across the border in Victoria is Mulwala's twin town of Yarrawonga.

Mulwala is a popular destination for water sports and fishing, especially for tourists from nearby Melbourne,  to the south. Other popular attractions include three major licensed clubs.

The local Australian rules football club, Mulwala Football Club competes in the Murray Football League.

History 

In 1847 James McRae arrived in the district to take charge of "Mulwala" and "Boroge" stations on behalf of the squatter Linbourne. McRae built a punt and a public house at the locality. He obtained a licence for his Travellers' Rest Hotel in 1853.

In 1858 Surveyor Adams marked out a township at the site. In 1866 a new hotel was opened at Mulwala and a school established at the township. Mulwala Post Office opened in 1864 for about six weeks, closed due to a large fire, and was reopened on 1 June 1866. The pioneer, James McRae, died in 1866.

In 1872 Mulwala was described as a small township of about 100 inhabitants, possessing a church, a school, a post-office and a public house.

In 1887 it was reported that Mulwala had two hotels and two stores; a court-house had been erected and a sawmill started.

In 1972, Mulwala was the site for a large outdoor pop music festival, which despite boasting big Australian names (Chain, Doug Parkinson, Billy Thorpe and the Aztecs) and some overseas artists (Canned Heat, Stephen Stills & Manassas), was considered a flop, after rain had washed out the site by the third day.

On 21 March 2013, Mulwala was one of the areas affected by a tornado, injuring over 20 people and damaging several buildings and houses. A caravan park approximately 5 km east of Mulwala was severely affected with most of the park's caravans damaged beyond repair.

Heritage listings

Mulwala contains a number of heritage-listed sites, including:
 North Road: Mulwala Homestead

Transport 
Mulwala Railway Station is a station with a silo on the Oaklands railway line.

References

External links 

 
 Mulwala Rail Platform

Towns in the Riverina
Towns in New South Wales
Mulwala, New South Wales
Federation Council, New South Wales